Dettmer is a surname. Notable people with the surname include:

Bob Dettmer (born 1951), American politician
Brian Dettmer (born 1974), American contemporary artist
Colin Dettmer
Douglas Dettmer (born 1964), Church of England archdeacon
John Dettmer (born 1970), American baseball player
Surnames from given names